Jamesy P (born James Morgan, 18 May 1970, St. Vincent and the Grenadines) is a Vincentian musician (and former barber) who released a soca single in 2002 titled "Nookie". Its 2005 release was a hit, reaching No. 14 on the UK Singles Chart, as well as becoming the biggest song in the Caribbean 2005 to 2006, and hitting Billboards urban charts in the United States and Canada.

Discography

Singles

References

External links
SocaNews.com: Interviews: Nookie Tonight, 3 January 2005
Guardian Unlimited: Who the hell is Jamesy P?, 15 September 2005.

1970 births
Living people
Saint Vincent and the Grenadines musicians
Soca musicians